Kepler Lake is a reservoir located in Northwest Louisiana, USA. Kepler is an open lake available for fishing and boating. Kepler's spillway drains into Black Lake Bayou which drains into Black Lake in Natchitoches Parish. Piney Woods Road is the only road that crosses Kepler. The Kepler spillway is located on the south side of the lake. Kepler has several boat launches and landings used for camping. Construction of the spillway was completed in 1958.

Kepler is home to a variety of wildlife ranging from alligators, bass, bream, perch, gar, and most notably its catfish.

Kepler has many houses on its banks. People who live about the waterway are referred to as the Kepler Lake Community. The Kepler Lake Community have Jamestown addresses and ZIP Codes but Castor phone numbers and live within the Castor district of the Bienville Parish School Board.

Landscape
Kepler Lake is small in comparison to other lakes in Louisiana. At the main boat launch—near the spillway—one can see across the entirety of the lake to the white-concrete Piney Woods road bridge. Channels have been cut into Kepler Lake to ensure boaters do not run their boats onto stumps. In recent years, there have been extensive draining of Kepler just to remove the stumps.

Geography

Kepler's coordinates are N 32.31682 and W -93.1535 and its altitude is 171 feet (52 m).

References

Bodies of water of Bienville Parish, Louisiana
Reservoirs in Louisiana
Protected areas of Bienville Parish, Louisiana